Dzhebel Municipality is a municipality in Kardzhali Province, Bulgaria. It includes the town of Dzhebel and a number of villages.

Demography 
In recent years, the number of births decreased dramatically. The number of deaths increased in the beginning of the 2000s and remained fairly stable after. That led to a natural negative growth rate. However, the demographic situation is Dzhebel is more favourable compared to other areas in Bulgaria.

Religion 
According to the latest Bulgarian census of 2011, the religious composition, among those who answered the optional question on religious identification, was the following:

References 

Municipalities in Kardzhali Province